Euphaedra proserpina, the splendid Ceres forester, is a butterfly in the family Nymphalidae. It is found in Nigeria and Cameroon. The habitat consists of wetter forests.

Subspecies
Euphaedra proserpina proserpina (Nigeria, western Cameroon)
Euphaedra proserpina tisiphona Hecq, 1983 (Cameroon)

References

Butterflies described in 1983
proserpina